Rusche is a surname of German origin, being a variant of the surname Rusch. Notable people with the surname include:

Georg Rusche (1900-1950), German political economist and criminologist
Herbert Rusche (born 1952), German politician and LGBT activist
John Rusche (born 1950), American politician

See also
Carol Rusche Bentel (born 1957), American architect and educator
Rusch
Rushe